When We're Born is a 2019 Egyptian musical drama film directed by Tamer Ezzat and written by Nadine Shams. It was selected as the Egyptian entry for the Best International Feature Film at the 93rd Academy Awards, but it was not nominated.

Synopsis
Three stories about Egyptian life interlink.

Cast
 Amr Abed as Amin
 Ibtihal Elserety as Aida
 Salma Hasan as Farah
 Mohamed Hatem as Osama
 Amir Eid as Ahmed
 Passant Shawky as Yara

See also
 List of submissions to the 93rd Academy Awards for Best International Feature Film
 List of Egyptian submissions for the Academy Award for Best International Feature Film

References

External links
 

2019 films
2019 drama films
Egyptian musical drama films
2010s Arabic-language films

2010s musical drama films